El Dorado Springs is the largest city in Cedar County, Missouri, United States. The population was 3,493 at the 2020 census. The name is commonly shortened to El Dorado or El Do.

Geography
El Dorado Springs is located at  (37.870872, -94.021024).

Demographics

2010 census
As of the census of 2010, there were 3,593 people, 1,591 households, and 908 families residing in the city. The racial makeup of the city was 96.0% White, 0.8% Native American, 0.5% Asian, 0.7% from other races, and 1.9% from two or more races. Hispanic or Latino of any race were 2.2% of the population.

There were 1,591 households, of which 28.6% had children under the age of 18 living with them, 38.5% were married couples living together, 14.1% had a female householder with no husband present, 4.5% had a male householder with no wife present, and 42.9% were non-families. 38.5% of all households were made up of individuals, and 19.4% had someone living alone who was 65 years of age or older. The average household size was 2.21 and the average family size was 2.89.

The median age in the city was 41.1 years. 23.9% of residents were under the age of 18; 8.4% were between the ages of 18 and 24; 22.2% were from 25 to 44; 24.5% were from 45 to 64; and 21.2% were 65 years of age or older. The gender makeup of the city was 46.2% male and 53.8% female.

2000 census
As of the census of 2000, there were 3,775 people, 1,654 households, and 984 families residing in the city. The population density was 1,225.7 people per square mile (473.2/km2). There were 1,897 housing units at an average density of 615.9 per square mile (237.8/km2). The racial makeup of the city was 96% White, 0.4% African American, 1% Native American, 0.3% Asian, 0.1% Pacific Islander, 1.1% from other races, and 1.1% from two or more races. Hispanic or Latino of any race were 1.1% of the population.

There were 1,654 households, out of which 28.1% had children under the age of 18 living with them, 44.1% were married couples living together, 11.8% had a female householder with no husband present, and 40.5% were non-families. 36.4% of all households were made up of individuals, and 20.1% had someone living alone who was 65 years of age or older. The average household size was 2.21 and the average family size was 2.86.

In the city the population was spread out, with 23.7% under the age of 18, 8.5% from 18 to 24, 24.2% from 25 to 44, 19.3% from 45 to 64, and 24.4% who were 65 years of age or older. The median age was 40 years. For every 100 females, there were 84.8 males. For every 100 females age 18 and over, there were 79.0 males.

The median income for a household in the city was $20,789, and the median income for a family was $26,366. Males had a median income of $23,109 versus $15,197 for females. The per capita income for the city was $12,575. About 18.7% of families and 24.9% of the population were below the poverty line, including 42.7% of those under age 18 and 16.5% of those age 65 or over.

History
El Dorado Springs was founded in 1881, near a natural spring by brothers Nathaniel and Waldo Cruce who attempted to capitalize on the namesake's spring water. A post office has been in operation at El Dorado Springs since that year.

Education
El Dorado Springs R-II School District operates one elementary school, one middle school and El Dorado Springs High School.  The city also contains El Dorado Christian School, a private institution.

The town has a lending library, a branch of the Cedar County Library District.

Arts and culture
An annual tradition is the Founder's Day Picnic which began early in the town's existence as an annual gathering for residents. It is a three-night event which has grown to be the largest attraction of the year and brings thousands of visitors to town.  In recent years, a carnival has provided rides and the City Council hires performers to give free concerts in the City Park. This upcoming picnic will be the city's 135th.

El Dorado Springs boasts Missouri's oldest municipal band performing in the United States at the longest continually used bandstand.

Media 
The city has two newspapers: The Star and The Sun; along with local FM radio station KESM.

Notable people  
Kamber Cain – country music singer 

Eugene McCown - jazz pianist and painter

Sydney Friar - Miss Missouri 2011

References

External links
 Chamber of Commerce
 The El Dorado Springs Sun Newspaper Website
 Cedar County Library
 El Dorado Springs R-2 School District
 Historic maps of El Dorado Springs in the Sanborn Maps of Missouri Collection at the University of Missouri

Cities in Cedar County, Missouri
Cities in Missouri